Joseph City Unified School District #2, also known as Joseph City Schools, is a school district headquartered in Joseph City, Arizona.

Joseph City Junior/Senior High School is its junior high and high school. The district also operates an elementary school.

The district includes Joseph City, a portion of Dilkon, and a very small part of land from Holbrook.

History
In 2013 the district leadership asked voters to approve an "override" of its budget. The measure succeeded, with 180 approving and 77 rejecting, a 70%-30% basis. There were 257 votes total.

References

External links
 Joseph City Unified School District

School districts in Navajo County, Arizona